Tempus is the name of two fictional characters appearing in American comic books published by Marvel Comics.

Publication history
The first Tempus initially appeared in Giant-Size Fantastic Four #2 and was created by Gerry Conway and John Buscema. He is an enormous humanoid who dwells in Limbo and serves Immortus. An immortal creature created from the stuff of Limbo, Tempus views his undying nature as a curse, and often remarks that he would consider execution a suitable reward for his services to Immortus.

The second Tempus first appeared in All-New X-Men #1 and was created by Brian Michael Bendis and Stuart Immonen. Eva Bell is an Australian teenager, who can create time-freezing bubbles and teleport people through time. Tempus is a new member of the Uncanny X-Men.

Fictional character biography

Servant of Immortus
On his master's behalf, the first Tempus has fought many different superheroes, including the Fantastic Four, and the West Coast Avengers. He was fought and defeated by Thor as part of a plot by Immortus to rob Thor of his ability to travel in time using Mjolnir.

The Destiny War was ignited when Immortus sent Tempus to kill an apparently critically ill Rick Jones on the moon. He was defeated by Kang the Conqueror, but was later rejuvenated in the same series by Immortus and sent to fight Hawkeye. Tempus' plan to defeat the hero by regressing him backwards through time to the point of non-existence backfired when Hawkeye regained his lost size changing abilities, granting him enough power to defeat Tempus again.

Eva Bell
 
Eva Bell is a goth-punk teenager from Gold Coast, Queensland. When her powers newly manifest, Cyclops appears and asks her to join his new X-Men. She at first doesn't want to and prefers a normal teenage life, but then the Avengers come to recruit her and she decides she will not have a normal life and Cyclops's team will be cooler. She then creates a time bubble that freezes the Avengers, so they can escape. 

Eva uses her time travel to erase the threat of Matthew Malloy, a mutant that was obliterating the Earth. She travels back in time to a younger Professor Xaiver. Matthew's parents never quite meet, thus erasing the threat from the timeline.

In the pages of House of X and Powers of X when the X-Men made Krakoa a mutant paradise, Tempus became part of the Five who were charged with the duty of resurrecting fallen mutants through a process called the "transcendent" which recreates their bodies, restores their powers, and restores their memories at the time of their deaths. Tempus' part involves accelerating the growth of Goldballs' unviable eggs after Elixir is done with the cellular replication. This was first shown when X had the Five restore Archangel, Cyclops, Husk, Marvel Girl, Mystique, Nightcrawler, Penance, and Wolverine following a mission that involved stopping Nimrod. Tempus and the Five were also seen when the United Nations recognized Krakoa as a sovereign nation as well as the first meeting with the Quiet Council.

Powers and abilities
Endowed with enormous strength and wielding a club, the first Tempus could trade blows with enemies such as Thor and the alien monster Alioth. His body was composed of the stuff of Limbo itself, which Immortus could control and use to summon an army of trillions from across time to fight Kang the Conqueror. Tempus also seemed to have some chronal powers as well, as evidenced by his aforementioned attempt to defeat Hawkeye.

Eva Bell has the ability to create time bubbles that freeze anybody trapped inside. She can also create time bubbles that freeze lasers and bullets. She also learns later that she can teleport others into the future, like when during a training session she teleports Magik 10 seconds into the future. As a young mutant she does not know the extent of her powers.

References

External links
 Tempus (Eva Bell) at Marvel Wiki
 

Australian superheroes
Characters created by Brian Michael Bendis
Characters created by Gerry Conway
Characters created by John Buscema
Fictional characters who can manipulate time
Fictional characters with immortality
Fictional people from Queensland
Marvel Comics characters with superhuman strength
Marvel Comics female superheroes
Marvel Comics supervillains